Evaluative voting may refer to:

 Majority Judgment (MJ) a single-winner electoral system where each voter may grade each candidates' suitability for office: Excellent, Very Good, Good, Acceptable, Poor, or Reject.  The winner is the one who receives support from and absolute majority of all the voters, the one who receives the highest median-grade. 
 Evaluative Proportional Representation (EPR), in Proportional Representation, each voter grades each candidates' suitability for office: Excellent, Very Good, Good, Acceptable, Poor, or Reject.  Each elected member of the legislature has a different weighted vote.  Each member's weighted vote is composed of the number of highest grades, remaining highest grades, or proxy votes exclusively received from all the voters. 
 Cardinal voting, any electoral system which allows the voter to give each candidate an independent rating or grade
 Approval voting, a single-winner electoral system where each voter may select ("approve") any number of candidates
 Combined approval voting, with a 3-valued Support/Oppose/Neutral scale (as named by Claude Hillinger)
 Score voting, with scales like (0, 1), (-1, 0, 1), (0, 1, 2), and (0, 1, ..., 20)